Johnny McIntyre (born 7 July 1956) is a Scottish former professional footballer who played as a right winger.

Career
Born in Greenock, McIntyre played in his native Scotland for Largs Thistle, Clydebank, Leven and Oakley United, as well as in France for AS Cherbourg.

References

1956 births
Living people
Scottish footballers
Largs Thistle F.C. players
Clydebank F.C. (1965) players
AS Cherbourg Football players
Scottish Football League players
Scottish expatriate footballers
Expatriate footballers in France
Association football wingers
Footballers from Greenock
Scottish expatriate sportspeople in France
Scottish Junior Football Association players
Oakley United F.C. players